Mais Alto is a Portuguese language aviation magazine published by the Portuguese Air Force since 1959. It is sold in Portugal and also has subscribers in Australia, Belgium, Brazil, Italy, Finland, France, Netherlands, United Kingdom, Spain, Sweden, Germany, Uruguay, Mexico, United States, and South Africa.

References

External links
 Mais Alto, official website 
 Revista Mais Alto 

1959 establishments in Portugal
Aviation magazines
History magazines
Magazines established in 1959
Magazines published in Lisbon
Military magazines
Portuguese-language magazines
Monthly magazines published in Portugal